Deliver Us from Eva is a 2003 American romantic comedy film starring LL Cool J and Gabrielle Union, revolving around LL's character Ray being paid to date a troublesome young lady named Eva (Union). It is considered by many as a modern update of William Shakespeare's play, The Taming of the Shrew. It was released to the US theaters on February 7, 2003 by Focus Features, and also stars Essence Atkins, Duane Martin, and Mel Jackson.

The title is a play on a line of the Lord's Prayer: "And lead us not into temptation, but deliver us from evil."

Plot

Evangeline (Eva for short) Dandridge works for The Los Angeles Health Department as an inspector, a job most suitable for her bossy and perfectionist nature. She and her sisters—Kareenah, Bethany, and Jacqui—have been taking care of each other since their parents died when they were young. As a result of the combination of her personality and her family's circumstances, Eva's level of involvement in her sisters' lives causes a high level of tension between her and her sisters' significant others (Mike, Tim, and Darrell, respectively).

While the significant others are out at a bar complaining about how interfering Eva is, they come across Mike's old friend Ray Adams. Ray is a "Master Player" who can handle even the most difficult women. The guys hire Ray to seduce Eva and convince her to move away with him so they can finally be free of her meddling. Little do they know Eva has already been offered a new job in Chicago.

After a disastrous first date, Ray tells the guys that Eva is too difficult for even him to handle and offers to return their money. However, when he runs into Eva while at work delivering meat to local restaurants they make amends and begin a relationship. Eva and Ray fall in love, and Eva even temporarily abandons her shrewish ways. When things start to get serious, Eva's sisters all start comparing their relationships to Ray and Eva's relationship, making things even worse than before. 

After they find out about Eva's job offer, the significant others panic and attempt to break up the blossoming romance, claiming their wives never let them hear the end of the latest with Eva and Ray, and that Eva intends to stay in the city. Things get so complicated that the men finally hatch a daring plan: kidnap Ray, lie to Eva about his death in an accident and cajole her into leaving the city.

Eva believes them and arranges a tearful funeral for her "dead" boyfriend. In the middle of the service Ray appears, having escaped his prison, and the whole truth comes out. An angry Eva dumps Ray and storms out of the church. After the whole ordeal, Ray tries numerous times to apologize to Eva and tells her that he truly loves her, but Eva does not want to hear it and still plans to move on without him. 

Days later, she apologizes to Mike, Tim, and Darrell for meddling and being a huge pain and distraction for them and her sister's lives. She reveals that they dissolved and split their parent's inheritance and her sisters and their partners reconcile. Mike and Bethany become engaged. Eva leaves and starts her new life in Chicago. 

One day after a meeting, Ray surprises Eva on a white horse in front of her boss and colleagues. Ray reveals that he left everything behind in Los Angeles to come and be with Eva in Chicago. He tells her that he can't live without her and will do whatever it takes to win her back. Convinced, Eva takes Ray back and they share a kiss before leaving on the white horse, ready to start their new lives together.

Cast
 LL Cool J as Raymond 'Ray' Adams (cast by real name James Todd Smith, used for the first time.)
 Gabrielle Union as Evangeline 'Eva' Dandrige
 Duane Martin as Michael (Mike)
 Essence Atkins as Kareenah Dandrige
 Robinne Lee as Bethany Dandrige
 Meagan Good as Jacqui Dandrige
 Mel Jackson as Timothy (Tim)
 Dartanyan Edmonds as Darrell
 Kym Whitley as Ormandy
 Nikki Washington as Robin
 Royale Watkins as Telly
 Matt Winston as Oscar
 Ruben Paul as Rashaun
 Dorian Gregory as Lucius Johnson
 Kenya Moore as Renee Johnson
 Henry Kingi Jr. as Mounted cop
 Steve Stapenhorst as Mayor
 Stephen Saux as Bartender
 Terry Crews as Big Bartender
 Aloma Wright as Reverend Washington
 Jazsmin Lewis as Lori
 Terry Dexter as Valerie
 Mel Gibson as himself

Reception
Deliver Us from Eva received mixed reviews from critics, as it holds a 44% rating on Rotten Tomatoes based on 81 reviews, with the Critics Consensus stating, "Though Union and LL Cool J are appealing romantic leads, Deliver Us from Eva is too predictable and contrived."

Box office
The film opened at No. 6 in the U.S. Box office in the weekend of February 7, 2003, raking in $6,648,374 USD in its first opening weekend.

References

External links
 

2003 films
2003 romantic comedy-drama films
African-American comedy films
Modern adaptations of works by William Shakespeare
Films based on The Taming of the Shrew
American romantic comedy-drama films
African-American romance films
2003 comedy films
2003 drama films
2000s English-language films
2000s American films